The 1990 Australian Endurance Championship was the seventh running of the Australian Endurance Championship. It began on 9 September 1990 at Sandown Raceway and ended on 3 November at the Eastern Creek Raceway after three rounds. The championship was a CAMS sanctioned national motor racing title for drivers of Group 3A Touring Cars.

Teams and drivers

The following drivers and teams competed in the 1990 Australian Endurance Championship. The series consisted of three rounds with one race per round.

Results and standings

Race calendar
The 1990 Australian Endurance Championship consisted of three rounds.

Drivers Championship
Points were awarded 20–15–12–10–8–6–4–3–2–1 based on the top ten race positions.

References

External links
 Official V8 Supercar site
 Images from the Bathurst round of the 1990 Australian Endurance Championship

Australian Endurance Championship
Endurance